Anilkumar Raju Mandiraju (born 13 November 1989) is an Indian badminton player.

Achievements

BWF International Challenge/Series (1 runner-up) 
Men's doubles

National tournaments 
 All India Senior Ranking Badminton Tournament 2017 Pune 3rd place
 All India Senior Ranking Badminton Tournament 2017 Valsad 3rd place
 All India Senior Ranking Badminton Tournament 2017 Bareilly 3rd Place
 All India Senior Ranking Badminton Tournament 2016 Kadapa 3rd Place
 All India Senior Ranking Badminton Tournament 2016 Itanagar 3rd Place
 All India Senior Ranking Badminton Tournament 2016 Pune Quarter finals
 80th Senior National Badminton Championship 2016 Chandigarh Pre Quarter finals
 All India Senior Ranking Badminton Tournament 2016 Gujarat 3rd Place
 Radhey Shyam Gupta Senior Ranking Tournament 2016 Bareilly Pre Quarter Finals
 Malayala Manorama All India Senior Ranking Tournament 2015 Cochin Pre Quarter Finals
 V.V. Natu Memorial All India Senior Ranking Tournament 2015 Pune Pre Quarter Finals
 All India Senior Ranking Badminton Tournament 2015 Kakinada Quarter Finals
 All India Senior Ranking Badminton Tournament 2015 Hyderabad Quarter Finals
 Coal India All India Senior Ranking Tournament 2015 Bangalore Quarter Finals
 Radhey Shyam Gupta Senior Ranking Tournament 2015 Bareilly Runners Up
 All India Invitational Men's Doubles Tournament 2015 West Bengal Runners Up
 79th Senior National Badminton Championship 2015 Vijayawada Round of 32
 Malayala Manorama All India Senior Ranking Tournament 2014 Cochin Pre Quarter Finals
 All India Senior Ranking Badminton Tournament 2014 Gujarat Quarter Finals
 All India Senior Ranking Badminton Tournament 2014 Rajasthan Round of 32
 V.V. Natu Memorial All India Senior Ranking Tournament 2014 Pune Quarter Finals
 All India Senior Ranking Badminton Tournament 2014 Hyderabad Pre Quarter Finals
 Radhey Shyam Gupta Senior Ranking Tournament 2014 Bareilly Pre Quarter Finals
 V.V. Natu Memorial All India Senior Ranking Tournament 2013 Pune Pre Quarter Finals
 ONGC All India Senior Ranking Badminton Tournament 2013 Bangalore Pre Quarter Finals
 Smt. Vankina Anjani Devi Senior Ranking Tournament 2013 Hyderabad Pre Quarter Finals
 76th Senior National Badminton Championship 2012 Bangalore Pre Quarter Finals
 75th Senior National Badminton Championship 2011 Rohtak Runners Up
 Central Zone Badminton Championship 2010 Delhi Winner

References

External links 
 

Living people
1989 births
Indian male badminton players